World records in the sport of track cycling are ratified by the Union Cycliste Internationale (UCI). Item 3.5.001 of the UCI regulations defines the events in which world records are recognized.

Men

Records recognized by the UCI
Key to tables:

World bests

Women

Records recognized by the UCI

World bests

Notes

See also
 Cycling records

References
General
History of World Records – Men 3 November 2022 updated
History of World Records – Women 3 November 2022 updated
Specific

External links
 UCI - About Track (links to records at bottom of page)

Track cycling
Track cycling records